Ingrid Backlin (née Michaelsson) (born 16 May 1920 in Stockholm, died 24 February 2013) was a Swedish actress. Backlin made her film acting debut in 1940 in Snurriga familjen by Ivar Johansson, and would later participate in more than 30 films. She was married to actor Stig Järrel, and is the mother of former Member of Parliament Henrik S. Järrel and Helen Åberg.

Selected filmography
 Adventurer (1942)
 The Case of Ingegerd Bremssen (1942)
 Life in the Country (1943)
Widower Jarl (1945)
 Incorrigible (1946)
 The Sixth Commandment (1947)
 Poker (1951)
 A Ghost on Holiday (1951)
 In Lilac Time (1952)
 Kalle Karlsson of Jularbo (1952)
 Night Child (1956)
 Siska (1962)
 Nightmare (1965)

References

 Obituary - Svenska Dagbladet : Culture, Sunday March 3, 2013; p. 25

External links

1920 births
2013 deaths
Actresses from Stockholm
Swedish actresses